Romualdia elongata is a moth in the family Erebidae first described by Felder and Rogenhofer in 1874. It is found in French Guiana and Brazil.

References

Phaegopterina
Moths described in 1874